Faunula is a Neotropical genus of butterflies in the nymphalid subfamily Satyrinae.

Species
Faunula leucoglene C. & R. Felder, [1867]
Faunula patagonica (Mabille, 1885)

References

Satyrinae
Nymphalidae of South America
Nymphalidae genera
Taxa named by Baron Cajetan von Felder
Taxa named by Rudolf Felder